Epoch of Unlight is a melodic death metal band from Memphis, Tennessee. The band formed in 1990, playing under a variety of different names including Enraptured and Requiem until 1994, when they officially settled on Epoch of Unlight.

Biography

In 1994 they released their first demo as Epoch, a four song cassette entitled 'Beyond the Pale.' In 1995 they recorded their second demo, Within The Night… as a 4-song MCD, and in May 1997 they returned to the studio to record three new tracks which became a promo CD entitled Black & Crimson Glory. The band succeeded in capturing the attention of several labels, and in the winter of 1998 Epoch of Unlight signed with The End Records. Shortly thereafter the band entered the studio to record their debut full-length album entitled What Will Be Has Been. The album was described as a mix of melodic death/black metal. The band supported the release with numerous live shows including a five-week national tour with Norwegian symphonic black metalers, Dimmu Borgir and Samael. The tour consisted of over 30 shows throughout the USA .

The band's second album, Caught in the Unlight!, was recorded in December 2000 with Keith Falgout (Soilent Green, Crisis, Crowbar and Cephalic Carnage, among others). This album placed less emphasis on the black metal aspects that had been present in their prior work, opting for a more melodic and technical death metal sound.

The band supported Caught in the Unlight! with numerous live shows through the country including a two-week national tour with Enslaved and an appearance at the first annual Northern Lights Festival in Toronto, Ontario, Canada.

In 2003 Epoch of Unlight recorded a cover of Kreator's 'Betrayer' and At the Gates' ‘Raped by the Light of Christ’ for a split 7-inch single with Goatwhore through Bloated Goat Records.

The band entered Big Blue Meenie studio in New Jersey October 27, 2004, to record their third release for The End Records, entitled The Continuum Hypothesis. The album was engineered and co-produced by Erin Farley (All Out War, Agnostic Front, Sick of It All, Madball, M.O.D., Overkill, among others) This album saw the debut of new singer B.J. Cook (a.k.a. Lord Hellspawn) from Arkansas' Fallen Empire.

In October 2021, Epoch of Unlight entered AB Studios (Memphis, TN) with Alan Burcham at the helm to record their fourth full-length album, and their first since 2005, "At War With the Multiverse." It was mastered in July 2022 by Tony Lindgren (Fascination Street Studios) and is slated for an August 2022 release.

Discography
Beyond the Pale - Demo, 1994	
Within the Night ... - EP, 1995	
Promo '96 - Demo, 1996	
Black & Crimson Glory - Demo, 1997	
What Will Be Has Been - Full-length, 1998
Caught in the Unlight! - Full-length, 2001	
Goatwhore / Epoch of Unlight - Split 7-inch, 2003	
The Continuum Hypothesis - Full-length, 2005
At War With the Multiverse - Full-length, 2022

External links
 Official Site
Band Members
 Epoch on The End Records
Epoch of Unlight Bandcamp

Blackened death metal musical groups
American black metal musical groups
Musical groups established in 1994
Musical quintets
1994 establishments in Tennessee